Illinois Route 203 (IL 203) is a  north–south state highway in the southwestern part of the U.S. state of Illinois. It travels from just south of I-55/I-70/US 40 around Gateway International Raceway at Collinsville Road (former US 40) in Fairmont City, north to I-270 near Pontoon Beach. IL 203 is a former segment of US 66.

Route description 

IL 203 is a major north–south artery through the eastern part of the Greater St. Louis metropolitan area.

History 
By 1937, US 67 was signed on part of present-day IL 203. From 1938 to 1955, US 66 City was signed on this particular route as well. By 1939, US 67 Alternate was signed after US 67 was rerouted away from East St. Louis. Up until 1964, parts of IL 3, IL 162, and US 67 Alternate utilized present-day IL 203. In 1964, IL 203 was signed; replacing these routes. It originally traveled to Hartford, but this was later trimmed back to I-270 as of 1989.

Major intersections

See also

References

External links

203
Illinois 203
U.S. Route 66 in Illinois
Transportation in St. Clair County, Illinois
Transportation in Madison County, Illinois
Granite City, Illinois
U.S. Route 67